Thomas Long "Pegleg" Smith (October 10, 1801 – October 1866) was a mountain man who, serving as a guide for many early expeditions into the American Southwest, helped explore parts of present-day New Mexico. He is also known as a fur trapper, prospector, and horse thief.

Life
Born in Crab Orchard, Kentucky, Smith ran away from home as a teenager to work on a flatboat on the Mississippi River until reaching St. Louis, Missouri where he began working for John Jacob Astor as a fur trapper with other mountain men such as Kit Carson, Jim Bridger, and Milton Sublette.

Smith later accompanied Alexandre Le Grand's expedition into New Mexico as a scout, later learning several Native American languages. During the expedition he was shot in the right knee by a local Indian; the wound and resulting infection forced the amputation of Smith's right leg below the knee; it is said that he performed the operation himself, almost completing it before passing out from blood loss and shock. He then had to use a wooden leg from which he later earned his nickname. He also learned how to remove his leg and did that to defend himself during fights. Following the expedition, Smith became a successful fur trapper despite his handicap, later relearning how to maintain his balance while riding a horse.

By 1840, with the decline of the fur trade, Smith began kidnapping Native American children to sell as peons to Mexican haciendas. When the local tribes began searching for him, Smith fled to California, where he would become a horse thief for the next decade.
In one incident, Smith guided around 150 Utes under the leadership of Walkara across the Sierra Nevada, stealing at least several hundred horses from Mexican ranchers. Joining Jim Beckwourth and "Old Bill" Williams, Smith helped establish the largest horse theft operation in the Southwest until authorities eventually forced the gang to break up in the late 1840s.

Smith traveled to the Chocolate Mountains (and possibly the Santa Rosa Mountains, or the Borrego Badlands) where, after several years of prospecting, he was forced, by local tribes, to escape the area. Claiming he had discovered a large amount of gold-bearing quartz, Smith sold maps and claims to other prospectors of a mine known as the Lost Pegleg Mine until his death in a San Francisco hospital in 1866.

In popular culture
Each year the Pegleg Smith Liars Contest is held at California's Anza-Borrego Desert State Park.

Actor Ralph Sanford portrayed Smith in "The Lost Pegleg Mine" (1952), the fourth episode of the syndicated television anthology series, Death Valley Days, hosted by Stanley Andrews. In the story line, Peter Trumble (Gil Frye) (1918–2000) is competing with Jeanne DeCourcey (Gloria Eaton) in a race to find the lost mine.

Peg Leg Smith is mentioned in Pulitzer Prize-Winning author Robert Lewis Taylor's 1978 historical novel "A Roaring in the Wind"

Peg-Leg Smith is mentioned in Louis L'Amour's historic novel "The Lonesome Gods."

Smith appears in the 1995 computer game Oregon Trail II as the owner and operator of Smith's Trading Post near Big Hill and the Idaho/Wyoming Border.  Travelers can purchase supplies from his post and interact with him on the trail nearby.

References

Further reading
 Thomas L. (PEG-LEG) Smith's Hudson's Bay Company Fur Trade Operations

External links
 
 "PegLeg Smith mentioned in DRSBs" (references)

1801 births
1866 deaths
American amputees
Mountain men
People from Lincoln County, Kentucky